Bogangolo is a sub-prefecture of Ombella-M'Poko in the Central African Republic.

Administration 
The commune of Bogangolo is the only commune of the sub-prefecture. In 2003, its population was 7,358, entirely in rural areas.

References 

Sub-prefectures of the Central African Republic
Populated places in the Central African Republic